Jefferson Township is one of ten townships in Newton County, Indiana. As of the 2010 census, its population was 2,140 and it contained 964 housing units.

History
Jefferson Township was established in 1860.

Geography

Cities and towns
 Kentland

Unincorporated towns
 Effner at 
 Newton at 
(This list is based on USGS data and may include former settlements.)

Education
Jefferson Township is served by the Kentland-Jefferson Township Public Library.

References

External links
 Indiana Township Association
 United Township Association of Indiana

Townships in Newton County, Indiana
Townships in Indiana